German Township is one of thirteen townships in St. Joseph County, in the U.S. state of Indiana. As of the 2000 census, its population was 8,518.

History
The Wertz-Bestle Farm was listed on the National Register of Historic Places in 2001.

Geography

Cities, towns, villages
 South Bend (partial)

Adjacent townships
 Niles Township, Berrien County, Michigan (north)
 Clay Township (east)
 Portage Township (southeast)
 Warren Township (southwest)
 Bertrand Township, Berrien County, Michigan (northwest)

Cemeteries
The township contains Highland Cemetery.

Major highways

Airports and landing strips
 McClures Airport
 South Bend International Airport (fmr. Michiana Regional Airport, vast majority)

School districts
 South Bend Community School Corporation

Political districts
 Indiana's 2nd congressional district
 State House District 7
 State House District 8
 State Senate District 10
 State Senate District 11
 State Senate District 8

References
 United States Census Bureau 2008 TIGER/Line Shapefiles
 United States Board on Geographic Names (GNIS)
 IndianaMap

External links
 Indiana Township Association
 United Township Association of Indiana

Townships in St. Joseph County, Indiana
South Bend – Mishawaka metropolitan area
Townships in Indiana